Quasi is a genus of small-headed flies in the family Acroceridae. It contains only one species, Quasi fisheri, known only from Veracruz, Mexico.

The generic name is from the Latin word , referring to the likeness of the species to members of Terphis, a closely related genus. The species is named in honor of Eric Fisher, the collector of the only known specimen of the species.

References

Acroceridae
Insects of Mexico
Insects described in 2011
Diptera of North America